Saint Adamo Abate (c. 990 – 1060–1070) was an Italian medieval Benedictine abbot, a promoter of the unification of the Southern populations in Italy under Roger II of Sicily.

He was born in Petazio (today Petacciato) and was baptized in Guglionesi. He died on May 3 between the years 1060 and 1070.

See also
List of Catholic saints

Notes

990s births
11th-century deaths
People from the Province of Campobasso
Christian hagiography
10th-century Italian clergy
11th-century Italian clergy
11th-century Christian saints
Benedictine saints
Medieval Italian saints